The men's individual pursuit competition at the 2021 UEC European Track Championships was held on 7 October 2021.

Results

Qualifying
The first two racers raced for gold, the third and fourth fastest rider raced for the bronze medal.

Finals

References

Men's individual pursuit
European Track Championships – Men's individual pursuit